The Shapes We Make is the first album from the Mary Timony Band. It was released on May 8, 2007 on Kill Rock Stars.

Track listing
 Sharpshooter
 Killed by the Telephone
 Pause/Off
 Summer's Fawn
 Each Day
 Curious Minds
 Pink Clouds
 Window
 Rockman
 New Song

2007 albums